The 2012 Pro12 Grand Final was the final match of the 2011–12 Pro12 season. The 2011–12 season was the first with RaboDirect as title sponsor and the third ever Celtic League Grand Final. Ospreys won the game 31–30 against Leinster.

Shane Williams scored a 78th minute try in the corner for the Ospreys which Dan Biggar converted to seal victory by one point.

Route to the final

2011–12 final table

Play-offs

Match

Details

References

External links
Coverage at ESPN

2012
2011–12  Pro12
2011–12 in Irish rugby union
2011–12 in Welsh rugby union
Leinster Rugby matches
Ospreys (rugby union) matches